Mian Hamza Liaqat Advocate who is the current president  of the legal group The association of the jurist district bar association gujranwala , and he had been x student leader and former president of a student organization islami jamiat talaba gujranwala, . He has been a member of Diatrict bar association gujranwala and tehsil bar association nowshera virkan.

Production 

There are no film frames in the film shot when Jalil Mammadguluzadeh was alive. But the authors of the film tried to describe the writer's life and career, to portrait the writer, to reflect his thoughts, his  view of life, attitude to the socio- political issues of  his time. Along with Jalil Mammadguluzadeh, his contemporaries – Mirza Alakbar Sabir, Abdurrahim bey Hagverdiyev,  Mammad Said Ordubadi, Ali Nazmi, Aligulu Gamkusar, Azim Azimzade  and other Mollanesreddin supporters are also mentioned in the film. 
                                                                                                                                                                                                                                                                                                                                                                                                                                                                                                                                                                                                                                                                                                                           
The writer's life in Nakhchivan, his studies at Mullah school, Gori Seminary, Tiflis period of his life, development and publication of Molla Nesreddin journal and the author's struggle for the purity of Azerbaijan language are reflected here.

Crew  
 Directed by Ali Musayev
 Author of the Scenario: Yusif Samadoghlu
 Operator: Seyfulla Badalov
 Music Composer: Emin Sabitoglu
 Voice Operator: S. Dokgina 
 Consultant - Professor: Mammad Jafar Jafarov

See also 
Molla Nasraddin
House-Museum of Jalil Mammadguluzadeh (Nakhchivan)
 House-Museum of Jalil Mammadguluzadeh (Baku)

References

External links 
 Jalil Mammadguluzade — Youtube

1966 films
Azerbaijani documentary films
1966 documentary films